Michael Grigorievich Khomutov
(1795—1864) was a Russian General of the cavalry and adjutant general and an Earl (Hаказной атаман) of the Don Cossacks in 1848–1862.

References

1795 births
1864 deaths
Russian untitled nobility
Russian commanders of the Napoleonic Wars
Russian people of the Napoleonic Wars
Members of the State Council (Russian Empire)
Cavalry commanders
Recipients of the Gold Sword for Bravery
French invasion of Russia
Burials at the Feodorovskaya Church of the Alexander Nevsky Lavra